Hermann Gottlieb Friedrich Wittich (May 26, 1826 – October 1, 1906) was a German politician and an honorary citizen of the city of Rottenburg.

German politicians
1826 births
1906 deaths